Kristijan Bistrović (born 9 April 1998) is a Croatian professional footballer who plays as a midfielder for Dutch club Fortuna Sittard, on loan from Russian Premier League club CSKA Moscow.

Club career

Slaven Belupo
Bistrović made his senior debut for Slaven Belupo on 30 May 2015, coming on for Petar Mišić in 77th minute as Slaven lost 3–2 to Osijek. His proper debut came during 2016–17 season after the winter break, when he joined the senior team permanently. In summer 2017, during the preseason, Slaven drew 1–1 with Russian champions Spartak Moscow in a friendly match in Villach on 7 July. Slaven's equalizer was a joint effort of Bistrović and Bruno Bogojević, who netted it in. The match helped Bistrović attract attention of the Russian market, with Spartak's rivals CSKA Moscow's coach Viktor Goncharenko insisting that the club buys the young Croatian.

CSKA Moscow
On 12 January 2018, CSKA Moscow signed Bistrović for €500,000 until the summer of 2022. At the time of signing for the Moscow club, Bistrović had made only sixteen appearances for Slaven. On 8 March, he made his debut for the team in the UEFA Europa League round of 16 match against Lyon where he came on as a substitute for Alan Dzagoev in the 82nd minute. In the quarter-final home leg against Arsenal on 12 April, he was praised for his performance as CSKA drew 2–2, but nevertheless failed to progress to the semi-finals.

On 27 July, he played the whole game in the 2018 Russian Super Cup as CSKA defeated Lokomotiv Moscow 1–0 after extra time, earning Bistrović his first career trophy. He scored his first goal for CSKA on 18 August to contribute to a 3–0 victory over Arsenal Tula. On 1 September, he scored and assisted in a 4–0 victory over Ural Yekaterinburg, but suffered an ankle injury in closing minutes of the game. He came back to the team as an injury time substitute for Arnór Sigurðsson in a 2–0 victory over Zenit Saint Petersburg on 11 November. Sixteen days later, he made his Champions League debut in a 2–1 defeat to Viktoria Plzeň.

On 24 November 2019, he provided his compatriot Nikola Vlašić with an assist for the only goal in the 1–0 victory over Krylia Sovetov Samara. 

On 20 September 2020, he scored the only goal in the 1–0 victory over Ufa. Seven days later, he received two yellow cards and was sent off as Lokomotiv Moscow defeated CSKA 1–0. On 10 December, he scored his first European goal, as CSKA lost 3–1 to Dinamo Zagreb in the Europa League. It was notably the first and only goal Dinamo conceded in the group stage.

Loan to Kasımpaşa
On 22 January 2021, he joined Kasımpaşa on loan until the end of the 2020–21 season. Kasımpaşa had an option to make transfer permanent at the end of the loan term.

Loan to Fatih Karagümrük
On 12 January 2022, he joined Fatih Karagümrük on loan until the end of the 2021–22 season, with Fatih Karagümrük having an option to make transfer permanent at the end of the loan term.

Loan to Lecce
On 24 July 2022, Bistrović joined Serie A club Lecce on a season-long loan, with the option for a permanent transfer.

Loan to Fortuna Sittard
On 17 January 2023, Lecce announced that Bistrović agreed to a new loan to Fortuna Sittard in the Netherlands. Fortuna confirmed the loan two days later.

International career 
Bistrović represented Croatia on youth levels. He was named in Nenad Gračan's 23-man squad for 2019 UEFA Under-21 Euro. However, he failed to make a single appearance as Croatia finished last in their group. Two years later, he was again named in Igor Bišćan's 23-man squad for the group stage of 2021 UEFA Under-21 Euro. He played all three group games as Croatia passed their group for the first time in history.

Career statistics

Club

Honours
CSKA Moscow
Russian Super Cup: 2018

References

External links
 

Living people
1998 births
Sportspeople from Koprivnica
Croatian footballers
Association football midfielders
Croatia youth international footballers
Croatia under-21 international footballers
Croatian Football League players
Russian Premier League players
Süper Lig players
Serie A players
NK Slaven Belupo players
PFC CSKA Moscow players
Kasımpaşa S.K. footballers
Fatih Karagümrük S.K. footballers
U.S. Lecce players
Fortuna Sittard players
Croatian expatriate footballers
Expatriate footballers in Russia
Croatian expatriate sportspeople in Russia
Expatriate footballers in Turkey
Croatian expatriate sportspeople in Turkey
Expatriate footballers in Italy
Croatian expatriate sportspeople in Italy
Expatriate footballers in the Netherlands
Croatian expatriate sportspeople in the Netherlands